Mashankou Town is a town in Neixiang County, Nanyang City, Henan Province, China.

Administrative divisions 

Mashankou Town includes the following administrative divisions:

Mashankou Community (马山口社区), Yangang Village (闫岗村), Ciyuan Village (茨园村), Yuegang Village (​岳岗村), Dazhai Village (大寨村), Sishanmiao Village (​寺山庙村), Anbei Village (庵北村), Hekou Village (河口村), Duluozhuang Village (杜洛庄村), Shimiao Village (​石庙村), Zhumiao Village (​朱庙村), Damogang Village (打磨岗村), Baimiao Village (​白庙村), Sanchahe Village (​三岔河村), Guandiping Village (关帝坪村), Huabei Village (花北村), Lijing Village (​李井村), Wangchang Village (王场村), Tanghe Village (​唐河村), Maping Village (​马坪村), Xingshuping Village (​杏树坪村), Hexi Village (​河西村), Zhengwan Village (​郑湾村), Fangang Village (樊岗村), and Laozhuang Village (老庄村).

Notable people 

 Qin Yinglin, pig farmer from Hexi Village

References 

Neixiang County
Township-level divisions of Henan